Kensington is an unincorporated community and census designated place located in the Berkeley Hills, in the East Bay, part of the San Francisco Bay Area, in Contra Costa County, California. In the 20th century it was considered part of Berkeley, although it is across the county line. House numbers follow the pattern used in Berkeley, and Kensington shares two zip codes with the Berkeley Hills area.

The population was 5,077 at the 2010 census.

Law and government
Kensington is an unincorporated community of Contra Costa County that borders Alameda County. Unlike many unincorporated communities, Kensington has local jurisdiction over its police department, park services, refuse collection and fire department. These are governed by two elected boards. The five-member Kensington Police Protection and Community Services District (KPPCSD) Board oversees the police department, park services, and refuse collection. The five-member Kensington Fire District Board oversees the fire department and emergency medical services, of which the day-to-day function is outsourced to the fire department of El Cerrito, a neighboring city. The Kensington Municipal Advisory Board (KMAC) is a commission whose members are appointed by the Contra Costa County Board of Supervisors. KMAC is charged with land-use and development review and provides recommendations to the county planning and public works departments.

The sewer system is maintained by the Stege Sanitary District, which also includes the city of El Cerrito and the Richmond Annex area of Richmond. The East Bay Municipal Utility District supplies water and wastewater treatment services. AC Transit operates local transit service.

History

The area that is now Kensington was originally the territory of the Huchiun band of the Ohlone Indigenous people who occupied much of the East Bay of the San Francisco Bay Area. The Pedro Fages mapping expedition passed through the area in 1772.

In 1823, the Republic of Mexico granted Rancho San Pablo, an extent of land lying north of Cerrito Creek and the Rancho San Antonio, including that portion of land that is now Kensington, to Francisco María Castro, a veteran of the Mexican Army and former alcalde of San José. In 1831 his youngest son, Victor Castro, inherited the southern portion of the rancho, including what is now Kensington.

In 1892, Anson Blake purchased a portion of Castro's land, most of which is now Kensington.

George Shima bought ten acres north of Cerrito Creek and east of the present day Arlington Avenue in about 1911, intending to build a home there. He hosted an annual community picnic on the property for some time.

Land development companies had bought most of the Kensington area by 1911, when it was first surveyed. The area was named "Kensington" that year by Robert Brousefield, a surveyor who had lived in the London district of South Kensington in the Royal Borough of Kensington and Chelsea at one time. The first subdivisions were Kensington Park and Berkeley Park west of Arlington Avenue, with most streets named for locations in England, and Berkeley Highlands, with most streets named for colleges and universities.

Farmers in Kensington resisted inclusion in the city of El Cerrito when it was incorporated in 1917, and local voters have rejected incorporation various times since then.

In the 1920s, the East Bay Municipal Utility District (EBMUD) constructed an aqueduct through the Berkeley Hills to transport water from the San Pablo Reservoir to a still-active pumping facility in Kensington, located just above the Colusa Circle. Some of the water received by this facility is pumped up the hill to the Summit Reservoir located at the top of Spruce Street. The rest is pumped to other reservoirs serving the East Bay.

The population of Kensington was 226 in 1920, 1,423 in 1930, 3,355 in 1940, and reached a peak of 6,601 in 1950.

During World War II,  J. Robert Oppenheimer lived at 10 Kenilworth Court where he held meetings of the American Communist Party, while simultaneously working on top secret atomic bomb work, and denying any involvement with such political groups. The house is often mistakenly described as being in Berkeley. Later in his life, Oppenheimer lived at 1 Eagle Hill, also in Kensington.

Until 1948, streetcar line #7 of the Key System ran to Kensington from Berkeley along Arlington Avenue, terminating in the small commercial area at Amherst Avenue. The streetcar was then replaced by an AC Transit bus route of the same number, which continues to run along Arlington Avenue. The streetcar service played an important role in the development of Kensington, and was fed by a network of mid-block pedestrian paths, most of which persist to this day. The pathways, which traverse Kensington, were offered for dedication for public use to the County of Contra Costa at the time the various subdivision maps were recorded. The County never accepted the offer of dedication, and accordingly, the ownership of the pathways has been in a state of uncertainty. Some of the pathways are used by the public regularly, and some have fallen into disuse, are overgrown with foliage, or have been absorbed into neighboring properties.

The late local historian Louis Stein Jr. lived and worked in Kensington, maintaining a pharmacy on the corner of Amherst and Arlington Avenue. For many years, he kept one of the East Bay's oldest horsecars in his yard—one that had probably seen service between Temescal, Oakland and the University of California in Berkeley. The horsecar is now at the Western Railway Museum.

Geography

Kensington borders Berkeley and Albany to the south, El Cerrito to its west and north, and Wildcat Canyon Regional Park and Tilden Regional Park to the east.

Kensington is mostly single-family residential, with two small shopping districts. One of these is located on Arlington Avenue (at Amherst), the other centered on the Colusa Circle.

Demographics

Kensington's current demographics result from the historical trend of white flight. In the 1950s, many white residents of nearby Richmond, California moved to Kensington as the African American population of Richmond increased tenfold to meet the needs of its growing wartime and post-war industrial base.

2010
At the 2010 census 5,077 people, 2,199 households, and 1,417 families resided in the CDP. The racial makeup of the CDP was 78.1% White (74.8% non-Hispanic), 2.6% African American (2.5% non-Hispanic), 0.3% Native American, 12.0% Asian, 1.1% from other races, and 5.9% from two or more races. 5.2% of the population was Hispanic or Latino of any race.

The census reported that 100% of the population lived in households.

Of the 2,199 households 25.8% had children under the age of 18 living in them, 54.9% were opposite-sex married couples living together, 7.0% had a female householder with no husband present, and 2.5% had a male householder with no wife present. 4.1% of households were unmarried opposite-sex partnerships and 2.0% were same-sex married couples or partnerships. 26.6% were one person and 12.5% were one person aged 65 or older. The average household size was 2.31 and the average family size was 2.76.

The age distribution was 18.4% under the age of 18, 3.2% aged 18 to 24, 20.9% aged 25 to 44, 35.2% aged 45 to 64, and 22.2% 65 or older. The median age was 49.5 years. For every 100 females, there were 89.7 males. For every 100 females age 18 and over, there were 88.7 males.

There were 2,305 housing units, of which 2,199 were occupied, of which 82.9% were owner-occupied and 17.1% were occupied by renters. The homeowner vacancy rate was 1.1%; the rental vacancy rate was 5.0%. 83.8% of the population lived in owner-occupied housing units and 16.2% lived in rental housing units.

2000
At the 2000 census there were 4,936 people, 2,192 households, and 1,372 families in the CDP. The racial makeup of the CDP was 81.77% White, 2.55% Black or African American, 0.24% Native American, 10.58% Asian, 0.02% Pacific Islander, 0.91% from other races, and 3.93% from two or more races. 3.48% of the population were Hispanic or Latino of any race.
Of the 2,192 households 23.8% had children under the age of 18 living with them, 53.5% were married couples living together, 6.6% had a female householder with no husband present, and 37.4% were non-families. 26.7% of households were one person and 12.5% were one person aged 65 or older. The average household size was 2.25 and the average family size was 2.69.

The age distribution was 17.7% under the age of 18, 3.1% from 18 to 24, 25.4% from 25 to 44, 31.7% from 45 to 64, and 22.1% 65 or older. The median age was 47 years. For every 100 females, there were 89.9 males. For every 100 females age 18 and over, there were 89.3 males.

The median household income was $93,247 and the median family income  was $102,601. Males had a median income of $71,278 versus $55,347 for females. The per capita income for the CDP was $55,275. About 1.7% of families and 3.3% of the population were below the poverty line, including 3.0% of those under age 18 and 3.8% of those age 65 or over.

Education

The Kensington Branch Library of the Contra Costa County Library enjoys one of the highest circulation per capita rates of any Contra Costa County Library. Kensington Hilltop Elementary School serves to educate Kindergarten to 6th grade. Kensington is served by the West Contra Costa Unified School District. Children may also attend private schools in other nearby cities.

Religious institutions
There are two churches in Kensington, Arlington Community Church (United Church of Christ), completed and dedicated in 1948, and the Unitarian Universalist Church of Berkeley, which in 1961 moved from its original home in Berkeley to land in Kensington purchased from church member and architect Bernard Maybeck. There is also a Carmelite monastery adjacent to Blake Garden.

Points of interest

 Blake Garden

References

External links
 About Kensington portal website

Census-designated places in Contra Costa County, California
Unincorporated communities in Contra Costa County, California
Berkeley Hills
Populated places established in 1911
1911 establishments in California
Census-designated places in California
Unincorporated communities in California